The bi-cameral and bi-partisan Italian American Congressional Delegation (IACD) is composed of nearly 200 Members of Congress: twenty-nine who trace their ancestry to Italy and more than 150 Associate IACD Members who, although not Italian American, have an interest in the Italian American Community. 

The IACD is currently chaired by Bill Pascrell (NJ-8) and Mark Amodei (NV-2) of the U.S. House of Representatives. 

Italian American groups occasionally work with the IACD on issues of importance to the Italian American community and to advance U.S.-Italy political, cultural and trade relations.

Senate membership

John Barrasso (R–WY)
Catherine Cortez Masto (D–NV)
Ted Cruz (R–TX)
Joe Manchin (D–WV)

House membership

Robert Aderholt (R–AL)
Mark Amodei (R–NV)
Suzanne Bonamici (D–OR)
David Cicilline (D–RI)
Peter DeFazio (D–OR)
Diana DeGette (D–CO)
Rosa DeLauro (D–CT)
Suzan DelBene (D–WA)
Chuck Fleischmann (R–TN)
Jeff Fortenberry (R–NE)
Virginia Foxx (R–NC)
John Garamendi (D–CA)
Doug LaMalfa (R–CA)
John B. Larson (D–CT)
Kevin McCarthy (R–CA)
Steven Palazzo (R–MS)
Frank Pallone (D–NJ)
Jimmy Panetta (D–CA)
Bill Pascrell (D–NJ)
Nancy Pelosi (D–CA)
Scott Peters (D–CA)
Tim Ryan (D–OH)
Steve Scalise (R–LA)
Darren Soto (D–FL)
Elise Stefanik (R–NY)
Mike Thompson (D–CA)
Brad Wenstrup (R–OH)

Caucus members 

 Sen. Sherrod Brown                                                                                     
 Sen. Ben Cardin
 Sen. Thomas R. Carper
 Sen. Dianne Feinstein
 Sen. Charles Grassley
 Sen. Robert Menendez
 Sen. Charles Schumer
 Sen. Debbie Stabenow
 Sen. Chris Van Hollen
 Rep. Gus Bilirakis
 Rep. Rob Bishop
 Rep. William Lacy Clay
 Rep. Jim Costa
 Rep. Joseph Crowley
 Rep. Henry Cuellar
 Rep. Danny K. Davis
 Rep. Eliot L. Engel
 Rep. Raúl Manuel Grijalva
 Rep. Alcee Hastings
 Rep. Shelia Jackson Lee
 Rep. Eddie Bernice Johnson
 Rep. Marcy Kaptur
 Rep. James R. Langevin
 Rep. John B. Larson
 Rep. Barbara Lee
 Rep. Sander Levin
 Rep. Dan Lipinski
 Rep. Zoe Lofgren
 Rep. Nita Lowey
 Rep. Stephen Lynch
 Rep. Edward Markey
 Rep. Betty McCollum
 Rep. Gregory W. Meeks
 Rep. Jerrold Nadler
 Rep. Grace Napolitano
 Rep. Richard Neal
 Del. Eleanor Holmes Norton
 Rep. Ileana Ros-Lehtinen
 Rep. Lucille Roybal-Allard
 Rep. Linda T. Sánchez
 Rep. Albio Sires
 Rep. Jan Schakowsky
 Rep. José E. Serrano
 Rep. Bill Shuster
 Rep. Christopher Smith
 Rep. Fred Upton
 Rep. Maxine Waters
 Rep. Joe Wilson

Past members 

Mike Arcuri (D–NY)
John Baldacci (D–ME)
Lou Barletta (R–PA)
Kerry Bentivolio (R–MI)
John Boccieri (D–OH)
Bob Brady (D–PA)
Anthony Brindisi (D–NY)
Ginny Brown-Waite (R–FL)
Ann Marie Buerkle (R–NY)
Mike Capuano (D–MA)
Travis Childers (D–MS)
Ryan Costello (R–PA)
Chip Cravaack (R–MN)
Ron DeSantis (R–FL)
Pete Domenici (R–NM)
John Ensign (R–NV)
Mike Enzi (R–WY)
John Faso (R–NY)
Mike Ferguson (R–NJ)
Vito Fossella (R–NY)
Jim Gerlach (R–PA)
Greg Gianforte (R–MT)
Michael Grimm (R–NY)
Felix Grucci (R–NY)
Frank Guinta (R–NH)
Debbie Halvorson (D–IL)
Melissa Hart (R–PA)
Joe Heck (R–NV)
Peter T. King (R-NY)
John LaFalce (D–NY)
Nick Lampson (D–TX)
Mary Landrieu (D–LA)
Patrick Leahy (D–VT)
Frank LoBiondo (R–NJ)
Dan Maffei (D–NY)
Don Manzullo (R–IL)
Tom Marino (R–PA)
Frank Mascara (D–PA)
John Mica (R–FL)
George Miller (D–CA)
Connie Morella (R–MD)
Jim Oberstar (D–MN)
Tom Perriello (D–VA)
Mike Pompeo (R–KS)
Jim Renacci (R–OH)
Rick Renzi (R–AZ)
Marge Roukema (R–NJ)
Rick Santorum (R–PA)
Ross Spano (R–FL)
Tom Tancredo (R–CO)
Pat Tiberi (R–OH)
Robert Torricelli (D–NJ)
David Trott (R–MI)
Dave Weldon (R–FL)

References

Italian-American history
Italian-American organizations